Cooper, Cooper's, Coopers and similar may refer to:

 Cooper (profession), a maker of wooden casks and other staved vessels

Arts and entertainment
 Cooper (producers), alias of Dutch producers Klubbheads
 "Cooper", a song by Roxette from the 1999 album Have a Nice Day
 The Cooper Brothers, Canadian southern rock band

Businesses and organisations

 Cooper (company), an American user experience design and business strategy consulting firm
 Cooper Canada, defunct sporting goods manufacturer
 Cooper Car Company, British car company
Mini Cooper, the name of several cars
 Cooper Chemical Company, an American chemical manufacturer
 The Cooper Companies, an American medical device company
 Cooper Enterprises, Canadian boat builder
Cooper 353, Canadian sailboat
Cooper 416, Canadian sailboat
 Cooper Firearms of Montana, an American firearms manufacturer 
 Cooper Foundation, an American charitable and educational organization
 Coopers Inc., now part of Jockey, American manufacturer of underwear
 Cooper (motorcycles), an American brand of motorcycles
 Cooper Industries, an American electrical products manufacturer
 Cooper School (disambiguation)
 Cooper Tire & Rubber Company, an American company 
 Cooper Union for the Advancement of Science and Art, or Cooper Institute, a private college in New York City, U.S.
 Cooper University Hospital, in Camden, New Jersey, U.S.
 Coopers Brewery, an Australian beer company
 Cooper's (bakery), in Bangladesh
 Coopers' Company and Coborn School, in Upminster, UK
 Frank Cooper's, a British brand of marmalade
 Worshipful Company of Coopers, a City of London Livery Company

People
 Cooper (surname), including a list of people and fictional characters with the surname Cooper
 Cooper (given name), including a list of people and fictional characters with the given name Cooper
 Cooper (artist), American artist Brian Cooper (born 1976)
 Cooper baronets, several baronetcies, including lists of baronets whose last name is Cooper

Places

United States

 Cooper, Monterey County, California
 Cooper City, Florida
 Cooper, Illinois
 Cooper, Iowa
 Cooper, Kentucky
 Cooper, Maine
 Cooper, Minneapolis, Minnesota
 Cooper, Gloucester County, New Jersey
 Cooper, Passaic County, New Jersey
 Cooper, Ohio
 Cooper, Texas in Delta County, Texas
 Cooper, U.S. Virgin Islands
 Cooper, Houston County, Texas
 Coopers, West Virginia
 Coopers, Georgia
 Cooper County, Missouri
 Cooper Islands, Alaska
 Cooper River (South Carolina)

Elsewhere
 Cooper (crater), on the Moon
 Cooper County, New South Wales, Australia
 Cooper County, Queensland, Australia
 Cooper Creek, Queensland, Australia
 Division of Cooper, an electoral division in Victoria, Australia
 Electoral district of Cooper, electoral division in Queensland, Australia
 Cooper Island, South Georgia
 Cooper Island (British Virgin Islands)
 Cooper Island (New Zealand)
 Cooper Island (Palmyra Atoll)
 Cooper's Cave, South Africa
 Cooper's Island, Bermuda

Other uses
 Cooper Nuclear Station, power plant in Brownville, Nebraska
 Cooper Stadium, in Columbus, Ohio, U.S.
 Cooper Union, selective college in New York City
 Cooper, a dog who accompanied Peter Jenkins (travel author) in A Walk Across America 1973–1979

See also

 Couper, a surname
 Couper Islands, Nunavut, Canada
 Cupar (disambiguation)
 Koopa (disambiguation)
 Kooper, a surname
 Cooper bomb, a British 20 pound bomb in World War I
 Cooper test, a test of physical fitness
 PriceWaterhouseCoopers, formerly Coopers & Lybrand, formerly Cooper Brothers, a multinational professional services network of firms
 Sly Cooper, a video game series